Derevyanko is a Ukrainian surname that may refer to:

 Kuzma Derevyanko (1904–1954), Lieutenant General of the Soviet Army, Hero of Ukraine
 Leonid Derevyanko, Soviet sprint canoer
 Pavel Derevyanko (born 1976), Russian actor
  (1930-2001), Soviet/Ukrainian film scholar 
 Yuriy Derevyanko, member of Parliament of Ukraine
 Vladimir Derevyanko, Russian ballet dancer and teacher

See also
 
 8984 Derevyanko, asteroid named in honor of Tatiana Derevyanko (1977)

References

Russian-language surnames
Ukrainian-language surnames